Ramy Abu Ayach (born August 18, 1980) is a Lebanese singer, composer, and actor. Commonly referred to as the "Pop Star" in the Arab world for his impact and contribution to the contemporary Arab music scene and Pop Culture, Ayach is a winner of the most prestigious Pan-Arab awards, and is behind some of the most recognizable Arab hits of the modern era such as "Mabrouk", "Albi Mal", "Khalini Ma3ak", "El Nas El Ray2a", and "Majnoun". Also an actor, his most recent role was in the hit drama series "Amir El Leil".

Career

Music

Ramy Ayach rose to fame in 1997, when he won the 1st prize of the celebrated Pan-Arab talent show competition "Studio Al Fan". Shortly afterwards, Ramy Ayach released his first Studio Album in 1998 titled "Ra2e3", for which he gained critical and commercial success with pop culture hit singles such as "Bghanila w bde2ela" and "la3younak bade ghane". After the release of his debut album, Ramy Ayach quickly went on to become an icon in the Arab pop music, and a much-respected artist despite his young age.

In addition to being a singer, Ramy Ayach is widely reputed for writing lyrics and composing his own songs. He plays several instruments, among which the piano, the oud, and the base.

Following the great success and impact of his music throughout the Arab region and the Arab diaspora worldwide, Ramy Ayach went on to gain the title of "Pop Star", given to him by his large fan-base.

Ramy Ayach has been recognized and awarded prizes multiple times throughout his career, for both his work in music and as a devoted philanthropist.

Debut: 1997–2001
In 1998, Ramy Ayach released his debut album titled "Ra2e3", named after the hit single of the same name, which was first released in 1997. In 1999, Ayach released his second album titled "Mo3jiza", followed by a third album the following year titled "Diwan Al Hob", and a 4th album titled "W al2ah" in 2001.

Pop star status and international success: 2002–present

In 2002, Ramy Ayach released his 5th album titled "Albi Mal", taken from the album lead single of the same name. The album won Ayach the Arab pop stardom status with the now epic hit "Albi Mal".

In 2004, Ayach released his 6th album "Ya Msahar 3eni", considered to be one of the artist's biggest successes with pop hits such as "Ya Msahar 3eni" and the epic hit "Mabrouk", which is to date played in almost every celebration in the Arab world.

In 2007, another smash-hit album was released by the artist, titled "Habaytak Ana", which helped reveal Ayach's vocal capabilities and establish him as a respected artist. The album included numerous hits, and led him to perform at the prestigious Opera Houses of Cairo and Alexandria in Egypt. Ayach was the first Arab artist to perform at both Opera Houses, selling out both venues and gathering three generations in one place. His successful performances at the Egyptian Opera Houses won him the title of "Amir Al Tarab" (the prince of Tarab) by the Egyptian media.

2009 was another turning point for Ramy Ayach, which saw his first duet experience with Egyptian pop star, Ahmad Adawiya. The pair released the smash-hit single "El Nas el Ray2a", which topped the Arabic charts for a whole year, leaving a lasting mark on the Arab music pop-scene to date.

In 2010, Ayach released his 8th album titled "Gharami", a much-anticipated album which was a shift in the artist's musical genre. The album comprised the hit singles "Effrah Fiki" and "Majnoun/Tal El Sahar", highlighting Ayach's avant-garde persona. Furthermore, the music videos from said albums set a new level on the music filmography scene, and won the artist best music videos at the Murex d'or Awards. The Album as a whole won the artist "Best Art Work" at the 2012 Murex d'Or awards.

In 2012, Ramy Ayach released another smash-hit single titled "Jebran" which gained wide critical and commercial success. "Jebran" raised another bar in the Arab music scene, bringing yet another genre in musical composition and arrangement. "Jebran" was composed by the Ramy Ayach himself.

In 2015, Ayach released the hit-single "Yala Nor2os", a festive song imprinted by fast beats, a style now known to the artist.
In 2016, Ayach released "7keye Jeye" as the official soundtrack of the hit drama series "Amir El Leil", in which he starred as the leading role. "7keye Jeye" topped the Arabic charts for several months, setting another unprecedented success for a series' soundtrack.

Ramy Ayach's much-awaited new album is due to be released in 2017. The first single from this album, titled "Ya 7abib Al 9alb", was released in April 2017 and was trending on Twitter within 1 hour of its release.

Actor
In 2015, Ramy Ayach's first experience as an actor in a leading role, was in the pan-Arab thriller movie "Paparazzi".

In 2016, Ayach took on another acting role in the hit Pan-Arab drama series "Amir El Leil", a historic series based on the life-story of Lebanese Prince Omar Chehab, which takes place during the French protectorate era in Lebanon. Ayach's leading role, as Prince Omar Chehab, won him critical praise, as well as "Best Male Actor & Singer" award at the Murex d'Or 2017 awards, in addition to the Murex d'Or for Best Song of the Year. The series Pilot aired on the Lebanese-based pan-Arab network LBC in September 2016, followed by 76 episodes, with the finale airing in February 2017. The "Amir El Leil" series was a commercial, popular, and critical success, and ranked at the top of drama series in terms of viewers. The series also helped establish Ayach as a respected actor and an accomplished artist.

Awards and recognition

2017 | Murex d'Or for Best Actor & Singer 
2017 | Murex d'Or for Song of the Year 
2016 | Murex d'Or for Excellence in Singing and Interpretation 
2016 | LAU Appreciation Award
2015 | Murex d'Or for Best Lebanese Male Artist
2013 | Delta Award 
2013 | OTV Award 
2013 | Red Cross Friendship Association in Chouf Appreciation and Distinction Award 
2012 | Bissaraha Award for Best Music Video "Jebran"
2011 | Murex d'Or of the Year for Outstanding Achievement 
2011 | Murex d'Or for Best Music Video "Majnoun" 
2011 | 13th Festival of the Arabic Music Distinction Award on behalf of the Independent Syndicate of Moroccan Musicians 
2011 | Baakline Municipality Recognition and Appreciation Award 
2011 | AUCE Youth Ambassador
2011 | AUCE Distinction Award
2011 | Lebanese Diaspora in Canada Association Award for Singer of the Year 
2009 | MENA Award for Best Music Video " Al Nas Al Ray2a"
2008 | 1st International Song Festival Award 
2006 | Murex d'Or Song of The Year "Habaytak Ana" 
Lions Club | Appreciation Award
Rotary International | Appreciation Award

Discography

Ra2e3 (1998) / Music Box International
Mo3jiza (1999) / Music Box International
Diwan Al Hob (2000) / Rotana
W Al2ah (2001) / Rotana
Albi Mal (2002) / Rotana
Ya Msahar 3eni (2004) / Rotana
7abaytak Ana (2007) / Rotana
Gharami (2010) / Rotana

Track listing

2007: Habbaytak Ana
Habbaytak Ana
Khallik
Ya Bint El-Jirani
Aayni Aal Gharam
W Min El-Chebbak
Doummini
Dana W Ana
Khalli Indak Damm

2004: Ya Msahar Einy
Ya Msahar Einy
El-Hanan W El-Hob
Hobak Mehayarni
Khaleni Maak
Mabrouk
Ya Omry La
Habeeb El-Alb
Leeh

2002: Albi Mal
Albi Mal
Al Laylo ya Layla
Behwak
Heyya Heyya
Allah Yekon Maak
Hababteni feek
Keef Tarikne

2001: Dewan El Hob
Aarfeno
Allah Aalaik
Bakrahak
Khad Harer
Hatha Lotf Mennek
Men Awal Nathrah

2000: Wel'ah
Wel'ah
Ahl Lhawa
Ahlamak
Alby Elyk
Shtaktilak
Sawad El Ninny

1999: Mou'jiza
Mou'jiza
Elli Shobbaik W'lobbaik
Al-Soura
Beechak Mn Ben El Aynayn
Albi W'albik
Zghayar Oumry

1998: Rae'h
Rae'h
Laayounik
Khidni
Ghanni Ya Bolbol
Torkos A' la Daffi
Bghanilha

References

External links
 

1980 births
Living people
Lebanese Druze
21st-century Lebanese male singers
Rotana Records artists
People from Chouf District